Whim may refer to:
 Whim, U.S. Virgin Islands, a settlement
 Whim (mining), a capstan or drum with a vertical axle used in mining
 Whim (carriage), a type of carriage
 Whim, a reissue of Adventures of Wim, a book by George Cockroft as Luke Rhinehart
 Whim, a character in Jim Woodring's Frank
 Sillywhim, a fictional female character in Wee Sing in Sillyville

See also
WHIM (disambiguation)